Bhathan is a village and former princely state in Limbdi Taluka of Surendranagar District, Gujarat, India.

The village is in Dasada (Vidhan Sabha constituency).

History 
The tribute-paying state in Jhalawar prant, comprising only the village, was ruled by Jhala Rajput Chieftains.

In 1901 it had a population of 405, yielding a state revenue of 1,800 Rupees (1903-4, mostly from land) and paying a tribute of 701 Rupees, to the British and to Junagadh State.

External links and Sources 

 Imperial Gazetteer, on dsal.uchicago.edu

Princely states of Gujarat
Rajput princely states
Villages in Surendranagar district